Dru Samia III (born August 22, 1997) is an American football offensive guard who is a free agent. He played college football at Oklahoma.

College career
A four-star offensive tackle recruit, Samia chose Oklahoma out of 15 scholarship offers received.

Samia won the 2018 Joe Moore Award, and was named a second-team All-American and first-team All-Big 12 Conference after moving from right tackle to right guard. Scouts noted Samia for his hustle to the whistle, but also noted an occasionally high pad level. During his time at OU, Samia also made the All-Big 12 Academic Team twice.

Professional career

At the 2019 NFL Scouting Combine, Samia ran the 40-yard dash in 5.29 seconds, recorded 28 reps on the bench press, a 27.5-inch vertical jump and a 101-inch broad jump.

Minnesota Vikings
Samia was drafted by the Minnesota Vikings in the fourth round (114th overall) of the 2019 NFL Draft.

Samia was placed on the reserve/COVID-19 list by the team on November 16, 2020, and activated on November 25.

On August 31, 2021, Samia was waived/injured by the Vikings and placed on injured reserve. He was released on September 8, 2021.

New York Jets
On October 12, 2021, Samia was signed to the New York Jets practice squad. He signed a reserve/future contract with the Jets on January 10, 2022. He was waived on July 26, 2022 and placed on the reserve/PUP list. He was released on March 13, 2023.

Personal life
Samia is half Samoan, and got a tattoo to signify the importance of the Samoan culture to him.

He is married to Val Samia, who he met in Oklahoma while in college.

References

External links
 Oklahoma Sooners bio
 

1997 births
Living people
American people of Samoan descent
Players of American football from Sacramento, California
American football offensive guards
Oklahoma Sooners football players
Minnesota Vikings players
New York Jets players